Peak Forest is a civil parish in the High Peak district of Derbyshire, England. The parish contains eight listed buildings that are recorded in the National Heritage List for England.  All the listed buildings are designated at Grade II, the lowest of the three grades, which is applied to "buildings of national importance and special interest".  The parish contains the village of Peak Forest, and is otherwise rural.  Most of the listed buildings are farmhouses and farmbuildings, and the others consist of mileposts, a church and a reading room.


Buildings

References

Citations

Sources

 

Lists of listed buildings in Derbyshire